UFC 100 was a mixed martial arts event produced by the Ultimate Fighting Championship (UFC) on July 11, 2009, in Las Vegas, Nevada.

This event was the most bought UFC pay-per-view of all time with a buyrate of 1.6million, until UFC 202 broke the record with 1.65million.

Background
The event included two championship bouts and a fight between the two coaches on the Spike TV show, The Ultimate Fighter.

The main event was a rematch between UFC Heavyweight Champion Brock Lesnar and Interim UFC Heavyweight Champion Frank Mir. This championship unification bout occurred as a result of former UFC Heavyweight Champion Randy Couture's year-long resignation from the promotion. During his absence, the UFC created an Interim championship, which Antônio Rodrigo Nogueira won by defeating Tim Sylvia. Nogueira and Mir were opposing coaches on The Ultimate Fighter: Team Nogueira vs Team Mir, and fought for the interim championship at UFC 92. During the airing of the television program, Couture returned to the company and UFC President Dana White announced he would defend the title against Lesnar at UFC 91. The winners of the Couture vs Lesnar and Nogueira vs Mir matches would fight for the undisputed title. In his fourth professional fight, Lesnar defeated Couture via technical knockout to become the UFC Heavyweight Champion. Mir was crowned interim champion after becoming the first fighter to finish Nogueira. The match between Lesnar and Mir was set for UFC 98. However, Mir injured his knee while training, and withdrew from the bout. The next day, it was announced the fight would be moved to UFC 100. Lesnar and Mir had fought once before, at UFC 81 (Lesnar's UFC debut); Mir won via kneebar submission.

The co-main event featured Georges St-Pierre, defending the Welterweight Championship against Thiago Alves. Alves entered the fight after consecutive victories over three top UFC welterweights: Josh Koscheck, Matt Hughes and Karo Parisyan. St-Pierre had previously defended the title against Jon Fitch and UFC Lightweight Champion BJ Penn.

The third match on the main card was between top middleweight contenders Dan Henderson and Michael Bisping. The two were opposing coaches on the ninth season of The Ultimate Fighter (Henderson on Team USA and Bisping on Team UK). Bisping had a professional MMA record of 17–1, and was undefeated since moving to middleweight. He entered the bout following wins over Charles McCarthy, Jason Day and Chris Leben. On June 2, it was announced the winner of the fight would get a shot at UFC Middleweight Champion Anderson Silva.

A preliminary match-up between Dong Hyun Kim and Jonathan Goulet was scheduled for the card, but Goulet withdrew due to a shoulder injury, and was replaced by T. J. Grant.

K-1 HERO'S Light Heavyweight Champion Yoshihiro Akiyama made his UFC debut against Alan Belcher.

This event was Sherdog's 2009 Event of the Year.

Results

Bonus awards
Fighters were awarded $100,000 bonuses.

Fight of the Night: Yoshihiro Akiyama vs. Alan Belcher
Knockout of the Night: Dan Henderson
Submission of the Night: Tom Lawlor

Reported payout
The following is the reported payout to the fighters as reported to the Nevada State Athletic Commission. It does not include sponsor money or "locker room" bonuses often given by the UFC.

Brock Lesnar: $400,000 (no win bonus) def. Frank Mir: $45,000
Georges St-Pierre: $400,000 ($200,000 win bonus) def. Thiago Alves: $60,000
Jon Fitch: $90,000 (includes $45,000 win bonus) def. Paulo Thiago: $8,000
Dan Henderson: $250,000 ($150,000 win bonus) def. Michael Bisping: $150,000
Yoshihiro Akiyama: $60,000 ($20,000 win bonus) def. Alan Belcher: $19,000
Mark Coleman: $100,000 ($50,000 win bonus) def. Stephan Bonnar: $25,000
Jim Miller: $22,000 ($11,000 win bonus) def. Mac Danzig: $20,000
Jon Jones: $18,000 ($9,000 win bonus) def. Jake O'Brien: $13,000
Dong Hyun Kim: $58,000 ($29,000 win bonus) def. T.J. Grant: $5,000
Tom Lawlor: $16,000 ($8,000 win bonus) def. C.B. Dollaway: $14,000
Shannon Gugerty: $10,000 ($5,000 win bonus) def. Matt Grice: $7,000

See also
 Ultimate Fighting Championship
 List of UFC champions
 List of UFC events
 2009 in UFC

References

External links
Official UFC 100 Website

Ultimate Fighting Championship events
2009 in mixed martial arts
Mixed martial arts in Las Vegas
2009 in sports in Nevada